Stuart Pettman (born 24 April 1975) is an English former professional snooker player and author. The Preston native has qualified for the World Championship three times, in 2003, 2004 and 2010. He beat 2005 champion Shaun Murphy in qualifying to reach the 2004 World Championships. He has spent 11 seasons on the professional snooker tour, with a highest ranking of 35 (2009/10 season).

He had ten last-32 defeats before he first reached the last 16 of a ranking event. He started 2007/2008 strongly, reaching the last 16 of the opening Shanghai Masters (winning 4 matches before benefitting from Ronnie O'Sullivan's withdrawal) and then qualifying for the final stages of the Grand Prix by winning all 7 group games. His form tailed off after this, but he had a strong run in the 2009 China Open, defeating Mark Allen, Ali Carter and Graeme Dott to reach his first career semi-final. Pettman qualified for the 2010 World Championship, but was beaten 10–1 in the first round by Ding Junhui. Following 10–2 defeats by Mark Williams and Stephen Hendry in 2003 and 2004 respectively, this means Pettman's win–loss ratio of frames played at the Crucible is 5–30.

Pettman retired from professional snooker after the 2010/2011 season. He wrote a book entitled Stuart Pettman: As Sometimes Seen On TV about his experiences on the World Snooker Tour. He has recently been playing American pool, including at the 2013 Derby City Classic, where he scored a high run of 117 in 14.1 Straight Pool, which is the record of the modern era on a 5x10 ft table. He is currently living in Bangkok, Thailand, where he manages a pool hall.

Further reading

Performance and rankings timeline

Career finals

Non-ranking finals: 1

References 

 
 Profile at Pro Snooker Blog

English snooker players
1975 births
Living people
Sportspeople from Preston, Lancashire
Stuart Pettman